A hieroglyph is a character of the ancient Egyptian writing system. 

Hieroglyph or hieroglyphics may also refer to:

Writing system topics
Hieroglyphics: The Writings of Ancient Egypt, a textbook
Mayan hieroglyphics, the Maya script used for the Maya language
Hieroglyphics, the word used in the US science fiction film 12 to the Moon (1960) to refer to the form of the written language of the inhabitants of the moon
An informal term for pictographs, ideograms, logographs, lexigrams

Other uses
Hieroglyph (TV series), a cancelled American action-adventure drama series to air on Fox
Hieroglyphics (group), an American hip-hop collective
"Hieroglyphics", a song by the Vels from Velocity
Project Hieroglyph, a writing project founded by Neal Stephenson
Hieroglyph: Stories and Visions for a Better Future, a 2014 science fiction anthology edited by Ed Finn and Kathryn Cramer, based on Project Hieroglyph

See also

Hieroglyphics Imperium Recordings, a hip-hop record label